Wada'ah is a sub-district located in Hamdan District, Sana'a Governorate, Yemen. Wada'ah had a population of 32204 according to the 2004 census.

References 

Sub-districts in Hamdan District